Josef Moravec is a Czech paleoartist and painter currently living in the United States. He specialises in paintings of dinosaurs and has studied fossils for over 35 years to gain the necessary knowledge about them.

External links
 https://web.archive.org/web/20071107185025/http://www.wildprehistory.org/index.php?option=com_content&task=view&id=52&Itemid=76
 Josefa Moravce; prehistory.com

Year of birth missing (living people)
Living people
Czechoslovak emigrants to the United States
American people of Czech descent
Czech painters
Czech male painters